Avis Kimble (born October 18, 1944) is an American model. At age 17 she was photographed by Jon Pownall to become Playboy magazine's Playmate of the Month for its November 1962 issue.

Avis was one of three finalists for that year's Playmate of the Year, and appeared on the cover of the January 1963 issue. June Cochran beat out Avis and Laura Young for the title. Kimble worked as a Bunny at the Chicago Playboy Club, and also ran a boutique in the Windy City at the same time.

She was one of the Editors' choices for the top ten Playmates of all time during Playboy's ten-year anniversary celebration. She did not make the top ten list when the readers' top ten was voted on.

See also
 List of people in Playboy 1960–1969

References

External links
 

1944 births
Living people
1960s Playboy Playmates